The Beretta Px4 Storm is a semi-automatic pistol manufactured by the Italian firearm manufacturer Beretta and intended for personal defense and law enforcement use. The Px4 uses the same short-recoil, rotating barrel action as the Beretta 8000 and uses the same trigger and safety system as the Beretta 92, while being completely different in design from either.

Light-weight polymer construction with steel inserts, a modular trigger group, fully enclosing slide, Picatinny rail, and changeable backstrap options for the grip are a radical departure from previous Beretta designs.

Design details

Unlike the later generation Beretta 92/96/M9 series, the Px4's trigger guard is rounded for better concealed carry. The takedown pin of earlier models is replaced by a spring-loaded bar, accessed via frame recesses on both sides, which must be grasped and pulled down simultaneously to release the slide. The slide spring is doubly captive, being inserted approximately an inch into the transfer block at one end and a receiving hole in the front of the slide at the other. It is a self-contained assembly, completely captured by the polymer guide.

The magazine holds the top round directly behind the barrel's breech end so only a slight feed ramp is needed. This allows the barrel to fully support the case. The 6-R rifling of the barrel generates counter-clockwise torque which is harnessed by the locking system to reduce the amount of pressure required from the rotating barrel lock's cam and pin system to affect unlocking. The steel transfer block's cam pin is 5 mm wide and 2 mm deep. The entire hammer unit mechanism can be removed from the Px4, without the use of special tools, as a single group. This allows easy access to the firing mechanism for cleaning.

The Px4's design makes it impossible to assemble incorrectly from a field-stripped takedown.

The Px4 originally featured an interchangeable, luminescent 3-dot sight system (coated in Super-LumiNova) for use in dark or low-light situations. With short exposure to any kind of light, the night sights' luminescence lasted up to 30 minutes.

Beretta discontinued the luminescent 3-dot nights sights for the Px4 in 2010, replacing them with standard 3-dot sights.
The weapon also incorporates a Picatinny rail under the muzzle to allow flashlights, laser sights, and other accessories to be attached.

Modular parts
To aid the versatility of the Px4, a number of parts were designed to be modular. These parts include the backstrap, the magazine release button, the slide catch and the hammer unit mechanism. The backstrap is available in three sizes: slim, standard and oversized. The magazine release button can be mounted on either side of the weapon and replaced by one of three types: standard, large or combat (extended). The standard slide catch can be replaced with a slimmer version to avoid snagging when the weapon is drawn quickly from a holster.

Models
The Px4 is available in four models:

 Type C: So-called to be Single-action-only ("Constant Action" - hammer is in half-cocked position). Spurless hammer. No decocker. No safety.
 Type D: Double-action-only. Spurless hammer. No decocker. No safety.
 Type F: Single and double-action. Decocker. Manual safety.
 Type G: Single and double-action. Decocker. No manual safety.

Px4 Subcompact

The Px4 Storm Subcompact is a compact Px4 chambered in 9×19mm and .40 S&W. It has a DA/SA trigger. The Px4 Subcompact uses a tilt barrel system. It is intended for personal defense and law enforcement use with a focus on concealed carry.

Beretta is marketing the Px4 Subcompact as the most advanced subcompact sidearm in existence. It is lightweight and small. The barrel is stainless steel, to help prevent corrosion from perspiration. The magazine release button is both changeable and reversible. Finally, Beretta's patented SnapGrip Magazine Extender extends the grip size down for a more secure grip.

A high magazine capacity is available, along with a magazine adapter to extend the grip to accommodate the full size magazine increasing capacity to 17 or 20 rounds in 9 mm, and 14 or 17 rounds in .40 S&W. The Beretta Px4 Sub Compact Magazine Adapter adapts the full size Px4 magazine for use in Px4 Subcompact pistol.

Px4 Compact
The Px4 Storm Compact is sized between the Full Size and the Subcompact models. It adopts the rotating barrel design of the full size pistols, but with a shorter and proportioned slide and grip. This model also introduces an ambidextrous slide stop lever. A high magazine capacity is maintained, with 15 rounds in 9 mm and 12 rounds in .40 S&W. The Px4 Storm Compact models accept the full size magazines as well, increasing capacity to 17 or 20 rounds in 9 mm and 14 or 17 rounds in .40 S&W.

Px4 Compact Carry 
In January 2016, in collaboration with Ernest Langdon of Langdon Tactical, Beretta announced the Px4 Compact Carry, an optimized version of the Px4 Compact meant specifically for concealed carry. It is a Type G (has a low profile decocker) available only in 9x19mm, includes a larger magazine release button, uses the improved Beretta plated competition hammer group for an improved, lighter trigger pull, a thinner slide with a Sniper Grey Cerakote coating (different from regular Compact model), an Ameriglo high-visibility orange tritium front sight and black rear notch sights for fast target acquisition, and includes a Talon grip wrap for improved grip texture and handling. It also comes with a total of three 15-round magazines. It was delayed from its original release date due to supply issues with the sights, and was released at the beginning of 2017.

Joint Combat Pistol

The Px4 is available in .45 ACP designated as the Px4 Storm SD (Special Duty). Notable differences between the standard .45 ACP and the Special Duty are the desert tan frame color, PVD coated magazines and internal firing control assembly, double recoil spring, specially roll marked slide and a longer barrel to facilitate the use of a suppressor. The PVD coated magazines (one 9- and two 10-round magazines come with the package) are not scheduled to be imported and there will only be one production run of the Px4SD. Supplies are limited. Initial photos show the barrel with a silver proprietary coating but the production models have a black finished barrel. Also, pistol tags indicate that superluminova sight paint is standard but Beretta USA discontinued use of the paint in 2009 so the Px4SD will have standard white 3-dot sights. The special Pelican case contains oil, cleaning kit, three magazines, pistol, all three back straps, all three magazine buttons, manual, warranty card and two foam dividers.

Prices for this pistol are ranging from $750 to $1200 new.

Project Allegiance
Announced in late 2007, Project Allegiance has Beretta USA paying a $10,000 death benefit for any law enforcement officer who participates in the program. "Participate" means purchasing a Px4, and registering with the program. It is good for three years after the purchase. Beretta is also offering free counseling, legal, and financial advice to the survivors of the officer who is killed in the line of duty as part of the program.

Users

Current users
 : 1,500 pistols；Buenos Aires Metropolitan Police & Buenos Aires City Police
 
 : Canada Border Services Agency
 : Used by the Special forces
: Used by Para (Special Forces) as a sidearm.
: Used by NOCS. and Guardia di Finanza
 : Ordered 7500 Px4 before the civil war
 : 400 pistols；Royal Malaysia Police and Ministry of Home Affairs
 : Polícia de Segurança Pública
: Romanian Police - 25,000 pistols
 : 40,000 pistols；South African Police Service and several Metro Police Departments.
 : Formerly used by PTJ.
: The 707th Special Mission Battalion has been photographed using the Px4 during exercises. Presidential Security Service also uses Px4 alongside other pistols.
 : Ordered 120 pistols
 : Used by the Ohio County, WV Sheriff's Department, Maryland State Police, Sparta, New Jersey Police Department, Providence, Rhode Island Police Department, Fresno Police Department, and Rochester, NY police department., Pharr, Texas Police Department.
: Venezuelan National Guard. Bolivarian National Police Corps.

Failed bids
 : 19 pistols evaluated as a replacement for the Browning L9A1 pistol, lost to the Glock 17
 : Evaluated as a replacement for the Beretta 92F, lost to the SiG Sauer SP2022

See also
 Beretta Cx4 Storm Pistol-caliber Carbine
 Beretta Mx4 Storm Sub Machine Gun
 Beretta Rx4 Storm 5.56mm Semi-Automatic Rifle
 Beretta Tx4 Storm Semi-Automatic 12 gauge Shotgun

References

Bibliography

External links
 Beretta Px4 Storm Website
 Beretta Px4 Product Spotlight (archived)
 Px4 Storm Full Size (and compact) manual
 Px4 Storm Subcompact manual

Px4 Storm Compact
 Beretta official Px4 Storm Compact page

Px4SC
 Beretta official Px4SC page
 Beretta Web
 Guns and Ammo News article

Beretta firearms
.40 S&W semi-automatic pistols
.45 ACP semi-automatic pistols
9mm Parabellum semi-automatic pistols
Px4 Storm
Police weapons